Edward Joseph Rosenbrock (6 February 1908 – 19 May 1978) was an Australian rules footballer who played with South Melbourne in the Victorian Football League (VFL).

Family
The son of Frederick John Rosenbrock (1869-1942), and Margaret Elizabeth Rosenbrock (1869-1934), née Corbett, Edward Joseph Rosenbrock was born at West Ham, London, England on 6 February 1908. He migrated with his family to Australia in 1912.

He married Ada Helen Georgiana "Dolly" Mustow (1910-2001) in 1938.

Football
Having played in the club's 1928 premiership side, he was recruited, by South Melbourne, from the Ferntree Gully Football Club in the Scoresby District Football Association.

In 1930 he was cleared from South Melbourne to Brighton. 

In 1935 he was cleared from Brighton to Frankston.

In 1936 he was cleared from Frankston to Brighton.

In 1937 he was cleared from Brighton to Frankston.

Notes

References

External links 
 
 
 Eddie Rosenbrock, at The VFA Project.

1908 births
1978 deaths
VFL/AFL players born in England
Sydney Swans players
Brighton Football Club players
Frankston Football Club players
English emigrants to Australia
Australian rules footballers from Victoria (Australia)